Dorg van Dango is an Irish-Canadian animated television series that first aired on RTÉ in Ireland on March 3, 2020, and on Family Channel in Canada on August 1, 2020. The series is created by Fabian Erlinghäuser and Nora Twomey and is produced by Cartoon Saloon and WildBrain Studios, and is made in association with Family Channel and Nickelodeon.

Plot 
The show follows the adventures of Dorg, a normal teen, living in the very normal town of Normill. That is, until he meets the Magicals; Jet Lazor, the super-cool unicorn; Patronella, an ancient witch; RD, a curious alien; and Yooki, an eerie ghost. They all escaped from Area 52 and are in desperate need of help and refuge.

To have them blend in with the citizens of Normill, Dorg disguises them as teenagers and hides them in the basement in the local shopping mall. With his new best friends attempting to help navigate life's challenges, Dorg's world just got a whole lot less normal and a lot more fun!

Characters

Main characters 

 Dorg (voiced by Chance Hurstfield) - the main character, a 13-year-old boy. He often serves as the voice of reason when problems arise among the Magicals.
 Jet Lazor (voiced by Deven Mack) - a super-cool unicorn who is the last of his species. His favourite food is apples. He's also rather smug and often comes across as self-centered.
 Patronella (voiced by Tabitha St. Germain) - an ancient witch. She speaks broken English with a foreign accent. Her way of solving problems involves using magical spells. 
 RD (voiced by Andrew McNee) - a curious blob-like alien. He is capable of shapeshifting, as well as storing vast amounts of objects within his body. He is somewhat dimwitted and goofy, with quite the appetite as well.
 Yooki (voiced by Kazumi Evans) - an eerie ghost. Though she seems polite at first and is cheerful, she can quickly become very frightening.

Recurring characters 

 Mr. Munch (voiced by Michael Dobson) - a mall security.
 Fretta (voiced by Briana Buckmaster) - Dorg's mother and the owner of a 98-cent store at the mall.
 Voulez (voiced by Gracyn Shinyei) - Dorg's little sister.

Episodes 

Note: All episodes' airdates indicates the Canadian airdate for them.

Broadcast 
The series was first shown on TRTÉ and RTEjr in Ireland on 3 March 2020, and premiered on Family Channel in Canada on August 1, 2020, and was acquired to Family CHRGD (WildBrainTV) in July 22, 2022. The series also aired on Nicktoons in the UK on August 31, 2020. The show has aired on Nickelodeon in October 26, 2020 in France, Nickelodeon in Southeast Asia, Latin America and Brazil in late 2020, and Australia in January 2021. It also airs on the has aired on the Europe feed in late 2020 and early 2021. The series also airs on RTEjr and TRTE in Ireland.

As of November 29, 2021, the show has also aired on ABC Me in Australia and can be streamed on ABC iView. 

As of 2022, the show has also aired in the United States on Roku Channel CITV in the UK, RTP2 in Portugal and TF1 in France.

Awards and Nominations

Awards: 3 wins & 13 nominations

 2021: ACTRA Awards
 Nominated, ACTRA Toronto Award: Outstanding Performance - Male Voice (Deven Christian Mack)

 2021: Irish Animation Awards
 Nominated, Irish Animation Award: Best Editing (Cartoon Saloon)
 Nominated, Irish Animation Award: KIDS CHOICE FOR BEST ANIMATED KIDS SERIES (OVER 6 YEARS OLD) (Cartoon Saloon)
 Nominated, Irish Animation Award: Best Animation Sequence (WildBrain Studios, Cartoon Saloon)
 Nominated, Irish Animation Award: BEST SOUND DESIGN (Gorilla Post, Cartoon Saloon)
 Nominated, Irish Animation Award: BEST ANIMATED KIDS SERIES (OVER 6 YEARS OLD) (Cartoon Saloon)
 Nominated, Irish Animation Award: BEST DIRECTOR OF AN ANIMATED TV SERIES (Fabian Erlinghauser, Matt Ferguson; Cartoon Saloon)
 Won, Irish Animation Award: BEST DIRECTOR OF AN ANIMATED TV SERIES (Fabian Erlinghauser, Matt Ferguson; Cartoon Saloon)
 Won, Irish Animation Award: Best Music (Leo Pearson; Cartoon Saloon)

 2021: Leo Awards
 Nominated, Leo: Best Animation Series (Josh Scherba, Nuria González Blanco, Katja Schumann, Anne Loi, Gerry Shirren, Tomm Moore, Paul Young, James Brown, Kirsten Newlands)
 Nominated, Leo: Best Performance in an Animation Series (Chance Hurstfield)

 2021: Youth Media Alliance Awards of Excellence
 Nominated, Award of Excellence: Best Program, Animation-Ages 9+

 2020: Leo Awards
 Won: Best Performance in an Animation Program or Series (Chance Hurstfield)
 Nominated, Leo: Best Animation Program or Series (Josh Scherba, Nuria González Blanco, Anne Loi, Gerry Shirren, Paul Young, James Brown, Kirsten Newlands; WildBrain, Cartoon Saloon)
 Nominated, Leo: Best Direction in an Animation Program or Series (Matt Ferguson)
 Nominated, Leo: Best Performance in an Animation Program or Series (Andrew McNee)

References

External links
 
Dorg Van Dango on Family.ca

2020s Irish television series
2020s Canadian animated television series
2020 Canadian television series debuts
2020 British television series debuts
2020s British children's television series
2020s Canadian children's television series
2020s British animated television series
2020 Irish television series debuts
Family Channel (Canadian TV network) original programming
British children's animated action television series
British children's animated adventure television series
British children's animated comic science fiction television series
British children's animated science fantasy television series
Canadian children's animated action television series
Canadian children's animated adventure television series
Canadian children's animated comic science fiction television series
Canadian children's animated science fantasy television series
Irish children's animated action television series
Irish children's animated adventure television series
Irish children's animated comic science fiction television series
Irish children's animated science fantasy television series
Television about unicorns
Television series about witchcraft
Animated television series about extraterrestrial life
Animated television series about ghosts
English-language television shows
Teen animated television series